Wallenberg: A Hero's Story is a 1985 NBC television film starring Richard Chamberlain about Raoul Wallenberg, a Swedish diplomat who was instrumental in saving thousands of Hungarian Jews from the Holocaust.

It won four Emmy Awards and was nominated for five more.

Cast
 Richard Chamberlain as Raoul Wallenberg
 Alice Krige as Baroness Lisl Kemeny
 Kenneth Colley as Adolf Eichmann
 Melanie Mayron as Sonja Kahn
 Stuart Wilson as Baron Gabor Kemeny
 Bibi Andersson as Maj von Dardel 
 David Robb as Per Anger
 Mark Rylance as Nikki Fodor
 Ralph Arliss as Teicholz
 Keve Hjelm as Jacob Wallenberg
 Jimmy Nail as Vilmos
 Olaf Pooley as Tibor Moritz
 Georgia Slowe as Hannah Moritz
 Guy Deghy as Adm. Nikolas Horthy
 Curt Lowens as Dieter Wisleceny

Emmy Awards and nominations
Wins
 Directing in a Limited Series or a Special - Lamont Johnson
Film Editing for a Limited Series or a Special - Paul LaMastra
Film Sound Editing for a Limited Series or a Special
Achievement in Costuming

Nominations
Drama/Comedy Special
Lead Actor in a Limited Series or a Special - Richard Chamberlain
Writing in a Limited Series or a Special - Gerald Green
Cinematography for a Limited Series or a Special - Charles Correll
Film Sound Mixing for a Limited Series or a Special

References

External links

1985 television films
1985 films
1985 drama films
Holocaust films
Films set in Hungary
Cultural depictions of Raoul Wallenberg
Cultural depictions of Adolf Eichmann
Films scored by Ernest Gold
Films directed by Lamont Johnson
American drama television films
1980s American films